De Vijftigers ("Those of the fifties") were a loosely connected group of experimental Dutch and Belgian writers, which was started in the late 1940s and were also connected to the Cobra movement. The group included Hans Andreus, Lucebert, Simon Vinkenoog, Armando, Hugo Claus, and Jan Hanlo, among others.

References 

Dutch literary movements